William Sowden may refer to:

 William Henry Sowden (1840–1907), U.S. Representative from Pennsylvania
 William John Sowden (1858–1943), Australian journalist